The Pienaars River is a river in South Africa. It is a tributary of  the Crocodile River. A short section of this river is known as the Moretele River (i.e. approximately 20 km section between Haakdoornbult and the Klipvoor Dam). Tributaries of the Pienaars River include the Moreletaspruit (alternative spellings: Morelettaspruit, Moreleta Spruit). Note that the above-mentioned Moretele river section is 60 km away from the Moreletaspruit and these two should not be confused with one another.

Course
It originates east of Pretoria, City of Tshwane, Gauteng Province, flowing northwards into Roodeplaat Dam (north of Mamelodi), which is also fed by the Hartbeesspruit and its tributary, the Moreletaspruit. The semi-stagnant water here and below the dam wall harbours quantities of cyanobacteria and its algal blooms. The river continues its northward course through the Dinokeng Game Reserve, where it is joined by the Boekenhoutspruit from the east, before passing under the N1 and turning westward towards Pienaarsrivier, the eponymous hamlet on its right bank, and Zaagkuilsdrift. North of Makapanstad the Apies River (or rather a short section of the Tshwane River) joins it from the south, besides the Plat River (or Utsane) from the east. The Pienaars continues westward and is joined by the Soutpanspruit at Kgomo kgomo before it enters Klipvoor Dam. About 25 km further downstream it joins the Crocodile River's right bank.

Gallery

Dams in the Pienaars River 
 Waterlake Farm Dam
 Roodeplaat Dam
 Klipvoor Dam

References

External links
Overview of the Crocodile (West)/Marico Water Management Area

Crocodile River (Limpopo)
Rivers of Limpopo
Rivers of Gauteng